The Nunamiut or Nunatamiut ("People of the Land") are semi-nomadic inland Iñupiat located in the northern and northwestern Alaskan interior, mostly around Anaktuvuk Pass, Alaska.

History
Early Nunamiut lived by hunting caribou instead of the marine mammals and fish hunted by coastal Iñupiat. After 1850 the interior became depopulated because of diseases, the decline of the caribou and the migration to the coast (including the Mackenzie Delta area in Canada, where they are called Uummarmiut) where whaling and fox trapping provided a temporarily promising alternative.

Historically, the Nunamiut hunted caribou. When caribou numbers dwindled in the 19th century, some Nunamiut migrated towards the Mackenzie River delta. Around 1910, with caribou continuing to be insufficient to sustain the native hunting, Nunatamiut migrated further into the Siglit area. They were spurred by increased demand for furs by the Hudson's Bay Company and the possibility of jobs within the whaling industry. The Inuvialuit of the Siglit area were unhappy with the arrival of the Nunatamiut, afraid that the Nunatamuit would deplete the Inuvialuit's Bluenose caribou herd. But the Nunatamiut, inland hunters of the Iñupiat region, were in high demand by the American whalers.

Eventually, the Nunatamiut who settled in the Siglit area became known as the Uummarmiut (people of the green trees) and intermarried with the local Inuvialuit.

In 1938, several Nunamiut families returned to the Brooks Range, around Chandler Lake and the Killik River. In 1949, the Chandler Lake Nunamiuts moved to Anaktuvuk Pass;  later, the Killik River group moved there also. Anaktuvuk Pass is the only Nunamiut settlement. A federally recognized Alaskan village is located Anaktuvuk—the Village of Anaktuvuk Pass, the Naqsragmiut Tribal Council.

Recording of culture and history
The Nunamiut were visited after World War II by Norwegian explorer and author Helge Ingstad.  He stayed for a period in the Brooks Range in northern Alaska among the Nunamiut, and afterward wrote Nunamiut - blant Alaskas innlandseskimoer (translation: "Nunamiut - Inland Eskimos of Alaska"). During the last few years of his life, he worked on categorizing and annotating the large quantity of photos and audio recordings (141 songs) he had made while living with the Nunamiut in 1950. The effort resulted in a booklet, Songs of the Nunamiut, with an accompanying CD containing the audio material. This is an extremely valuable contribution to the preservation of the Nunamiut culture because it turned out that much of what he had gathered in the mid-20th century was now lost locally and was only preserved in his recordings. Representatives from the Nunamiut later suggested naming a mountain in the Brooks range after him. Five years after Ingstad's death, it was named Ingstad mountain.

Culture
According to archaeologist Lewis Binford, the Nunamiut depend on meat more so than any other living hunter-gatherer group. The annual cycle of Nunamiut life revolves around the annual migrations of caribou.

Spring: The main caribou migrations happen in March and April, when caribou move north through Anaktuvuk Pass to feed on the plains.

Summer: The plains thaw and become a marshland swarming with blackflies and mosquitoes.

Autumn: The caribou hunting cycle repeats in September and October when caribou retreat south again.

Winter: There are about 72 days of total winter darkness starting around November 15.

Language
The native language of the Nunamiut is a dialect of Iñupiaq. In the late 1960s, the University of California, Berkeley sent undergraduate linguistics student (now Arctic explorer) Dennis Schmitt to the Nunamiut to study their dialect.  There are few native speakers today.

The Nunamiut speak English.  Their culture is contrasted by strong collectivist and individualist tendencies, both of which are reflected in their "uncertainty language game".  This involves one of five statements as part of a response:  "I don't know", "maybe", "probably", "I guess", and "might be".  Choosing the neutral "maybe" over "yes" or "no" reflects the cultural importance of a collectivist community.  It also reflects behavior avoidance of an individual making a false statement.

Notes

Further reading

 Binford, Lewis Roberts. Nunamiut Ethnoarchaeology. New York: Academic Press, 1978. 
 Blackman, Margaret B. Upside Down: Seasons Among the Nunamiut. Lincoln: University of Nebraska Press, 2004. 
 Gubser, Nicholas J. The Nunamiut Eskimos, Hunters of Caribou. New Haven: Yale University Press, 1965.
 Ingstad, Helge. Nunamiut; Among Alaska's Inland Eskimos. New York: W.W. Norton, 1954.
 Ingstad, Helge. Songs of the Nunamiut historical recordings of an Alaskan Eskimo community. [Oslo, Norway]: Tano Aschehoug, 1998. 
 Kakinya, Elijah, et al. Nunamiut Unipkaanich = Nunamiut Stories: Told in Inupiaq Eskimo. Fairbanks: Alaska Native Language Center, 1987.
 Rausch, Robert. Notes on the Nunamiu Eskimo and mammals of the Anaktuvuk Pass Region, Brooks Range, Alaska
 Spearman, Grant R. Nunamiut History. [Alaska]: North Slope Borough School District, Title IV, Indian Education Program, 1982.

External links
 Documentary- 50 Years of Northern Light, a look at Anaktuvuk Pass as reflected by the village church building. Directed by Caven Keith, 2011
 Documentary- Tradition Meets Modernity in Native Alaska, Wil Carson uses filmmaking to explore the changes in traditional Nunamiut village life, 1998
 Faces of the Nunamiut: Tourist Art and Traditional Knowledge in Northern Alaska- National Science Foundation grant
 Gates of the Arctic National Park Sights Page- the establishment of Gates of the Arctic National Park and Preserve in 1980 placed Anaktuvuk Pass, the Nunamiut's historic land, in the middle of a national park.
 Interview with Dennis Schmitt-Dennis Schmitt, linguist, Arctic explorer, discoverer of Warming Island, researched the Nunamiut dialect in the 1960s, under Noam Chomsky
 Mask making exhibit
 North Slope Borough School District- public school system
 Restore Nunamiut Kayak-The University of Alaska Museum, Fairbanks, and the Simon Paneak Memorial Museum, Anaktuvuk Pass, are restoring the only remaining Nunamiut (inland) kayak.
 Simon Paneak Memorial Museum- created by the Nunamiut people, located in Anaktuvuk Pass, Aipanni, the newsletter of the Simon Paneak Memorial Museum Endowment Campaign
 A heritage of whales and whaling among the Nunamiut Inupiat- ancient days, traditional times, commercial whaling, whaling today.

Alaska Native ethnic groups
Inupiat